Khabarovsk is a city in Russia.

Khabarovsk may also refer to:
Khabarovsk Bridge, a bridge across the Amur River in Russia
Khabarovsk-class submarine, a class of nuclear-powered ballistic missile submarines employed by the Russian Navy
Khabarovsk Krai, a federal subject of Russia
Khabarovsk Urban Okrug, a municipal formation which the city of krai significance of Khabarovsk in Khabarovsk Krai, Russia is incorporated as

See also
Khabarovsk Novy Airport, an airport in Khabarovsk, Khabarovsk Krai, Russia
Khabarovsky (disambiguation)